Catanzarese may refer to:

 Any person, thing or concept of or from Catanzaro, in Calabria in southern Italy, including:
 Catanzarese, one of the dialects of Calabria

In agriculture
 Catanzarese (pig), an extinct breed of pig, a former sub-type of the Apulo-Calabrese
 Catanzarese, an alternative name for the Italian wine grape Magliocco Dolce

Other uses 
 U.S. Catanzaro 1929, a football club in Catanzaro